The following lists events that happened during 1981 in Rwanda.

Incumbents 
 President: Juvénal Habyarimana

Events

December
 December 28 - Rwandan parliamentary election, 1981

References

 
Years of the 20th century in Rwanda
1980s in Rwanda
Rwanda
Rwanda